Craig McLachlan & Check 1–2 is the debut album by Australian actor/musician Craig McLachlan as part of the three-piece band Craig McLachlan and Check 1-2.

Background
From 1987–1989, McLachlan had played Henry Ramsay on Neighbours before joining the cast of Home and Away in February 1990 where he played Grant Mitchell.

In March, McLachlan won the Gold Logie at the Logie Awards of 1990. Concurrently, McLachlan was recording his debut album with his band, 'Check 1–2' and it was released during the height of his television exposure. The album would be released in June 1990 and it produced four singles, including "Mona", which peaked at No. 2 in the UK and No. 3 in Australia.

Track listing

Personnel
Adapted from the album's liner notes.

Musicians
Craig McLachlan – vocals, guitar
Mark Beckhouse – bass
John Clark – percussion 
Mark Meyer – drums
Garth Porter – keyboards
Chong Lim – additional keyboards
Roger McLachlan – fretless bass on "Go" and "Can't Take It Any Longer"
David Williams – toms on "Mona"
John Hinde, Lindsay Field, Nikki Nicholls, Lisa Edwards – backing vocals

Production
Produced by Garth Porter
Engineered by Chris Corr
Additional engineers: David Price, Greg Henderson, Ted Howard
Assistant engineers: Ian Hayes, Brendan Morley, Adrian Webb
Mixed by Greg Henderson and Garth Porter, except "Bigger Than Texas" mixed by Ted Howard and Garth Porter
Recorded at Platinum, Melbourne

Charts

Craig McLachlan and Check 1–2 debuted at No. 5 in Australia on the week commencing 17 June 1990 and rose to No. 4 the following week. It remained in the top 50 for 13 weeks.

Certification

The Video 

In 1990, a video was released which included the film clips to the four singles, as well as interviews with McLachlan and rare performances.

 "Mona"
 "Amanda"	
 "Rock the Rock"
 "I Almost Felt Like Crying"

References

1990 debut albums
Craig McLachlan albums
CBS Records albums
Epic Records albums